In chess, attraction is a tactical motif, typically involving a sacrifice that attracts an opposing piece, often the king, to a square where its new position can be exploited by a tactic favoring the attacker. This tactic is also referred to in chess literature as a decoy sacrifice.

Examples 

In the diagram, after the moves 1.Rf8+ Kxf8 2.Nd7+ Ke7 3.Nxb6, White wins the queen and the game. A similar, but more complex position is described by Huczek.

The second diagram shows a position from Vidmar–Euwe, Carlsbad 1929. Black had just played 33…Qf4, threatening mate on h2. White now uncorks the elegant combination 34.Re8+ Bf8 (forced) 35.Rxf8+ (attraction) Kxf8 (forced) 36.Nf5+ (discovered check) Kg8 (36…Ke8 37.Qe7) 37.Qf8+ (attraction)  Black resigns. (If 37…Kxf8 then 38.Rd8#.) The combination after 33…Qf4 features two separate examples of the attraction motif.

The third diagram on the right shows a position from the game Dementiev-Dzindzichashvili, URS 1972. White had just played 61.g6 (with the threat 62.Qh7+ Kf8 63.Rxf5+). However, Black continued with the crushing 61…Rh1+ (attraction) 62. Kxh1(best) Nxg3+ (the White rook is pinned) 63.Kh2 Nxh5 (and White has dropped his queen to the knight fork). In the game White resigned after 61…Rh1+.

References 

Chess theory
Chess tactics